Mangalpally may refer to:

Mangalpally, Nalgonda, in Andhra Pradesh, India 
Mangalpally, Ranga Reddy, in Andhra Pradesh, India